Residue is a British science fiction supernatural horror miniseries created and written by John Harrison and directed by Alex Garcia Lopez. The first series, which consists of three episodes of 44 minutes each, entirely premiered on 31 March 2015 on the streaming service Netflix. Residue revolves around the aftermath of an explosion in an English futuristic metropolis nightclub and the unreliable quarantine zone built by the government, who is hiding what is really happening inside it. In the meantime, a photojournalist (portrayed by Natalia Tena) stumbles upon paranormal events triggered either by or after the bombing.

In 2015 producer Charlotte Walls stated that there were plans for a 10-episodes second season, for which Netflix would have the exclusive option. As of 2018, there has been no further news.

Cast and characters

Main 
 Natalia Tena as Jennifer Preston, a photojournalist who sees herself trapped in a web of paranormal activity after an explosion on New Year's Eve
 Iwan Rheon as Jonas Flack, Jennifer's boyfriend who works as the spokesperson of the government
 Jamie Draven as Levi Mathis, a police officer immersed in alcoholism and drug addiction. His daughter dies during the explosion, which triggers his will to uncover whatever it is that the government is hiding
 Danny Webb as Emeril Benedict
 Franz Drameh as Willy G
 Adrian Schiller as Pierce
 Eleanor Matsuura as Angela Rossi, Jonas' superior, who is aware of what is truly happening in the quarantine zone but follows orders from Keller to conceal the truth
 Brian Fergunson as Dickie Prince
 Emilia Jones as Charlotte, a girl who survived the explosion and is hiding in the quarantine zone
 Tom Goodman-Hill as Keller
John Lamontagne as Extra

Production 
Series creator John Harrison envisioned the idea of a science fiction production and brought it to producer Charlotte Walls shortly after they finished working on Book of Blood. Harrison and Walls teamed up to gather material to the production, which then was intended to be a film. Walls later got funding from the British companies International Pictures Four, Screen Yorkshire and Green Screen Studios. British director Alex Garcia Lopez, known for his work in Misfits, was later hired to direct the project. Through Lopez, Misfits actor Iwan Rheon joined the project. It was released theatrically in the United Kingdom on 20 March 2015 to a limited number of theaters. The project was later screened at the 2014 MIPCOM, where it was selected by Netflix and later released internationally as a limited series.

According to Walls, a 10-episodes second season is set to start being developed.

Episodes

Reception 

Residue has received favorable response from critics. Writing for Observer, Drew Grant called the show a "must-see," saying that it is "an homage that feels creepily atmospheric in authentically original way, because this isn’t just some rich guy’s house that Tom Cruise stumbled upon. It’s a symptom of a growing sickness, pulsing its weird energies until it infects the entire populace." Brock Wilbur of Pajaba wrote that the experience of watching Residue is "rewarding" and "delight[ful]," affirming, "What starts as some grade-A neon-drenched abandoned architecture porn eventually spirals into an infestation of ghost-like entities driving the population of London to brutal violence, all under the watchful eye of a paramilitary group that knows more than it’s letting on."

References

External links 
 
 Residue on Netflix

2015 British television series debuts
2015 British television series endings
2010s British horror television series
2010s British science fiction television series
English-language Netflix original programming